Hydrotalcite or formerly also Völknerite is a layered double hydroxide (LDH) of general formula ·4, whose name is derived from its resemblance with talc and its high water content. Multiple structures containing loosely bound carbonate ions exist. The easily exchanged carbonates allow for applications of the mineral in wastewater treatment and nuclear fuel reprocessing.

Structure and discovery 
It was first described in 1842 for an occurrence in a serpentine - magnesite deposit in Snarum, Modum, Buskerud, Norway. It occurs as an alteration mineral in serpentinite in association with serpentine, dolomite and hematite. The layers of the structure stack in multiple ways, to produce a 3-layer rhombohedral structure (3R Polytype), or a 2-layer hexagonal structure (2H polytype) formerly known as manasseite. The two polytypes are often intergrown.

Applications

Nuclear fuel reprocessing 
Hydrotalcite has been studied as potential getter for iodide in order to scavenge the long-lived 129I (T1/2 = 15.7 million years) and also other fission products such as 79Se (T1/2 = 327,000 years) and 99Tc, (T1/2 = 211,000 years) present in spent nuclear fuel to be disposed under oxidising conditions in volcanic tuff at the Yucca Mountain nuclear waste repository. However, carbonate anions easily replace iodide anions in its interlayer and therefore the selectivity coefficient for the anion exchange is not favorable. Another difficulty arising in the quest of an iodide getter for radioactive waste is the long-term stability of the sequestrant that must survive over geological time scales.

Anion exchange 
Layered double hydroxides (LDH) are well known for their anion exchange properties.

Medical 

Hydrotalcite is also used as an antacid, such as Maalox (magnesium-aluminium oxide).

Wastewater treatment 

Treating mining and other wastewater by creating hydrotalcites often produces substantially less sludge than lime. In one test, final sludge reductions reached up to 90 percent. This alters the concentration of magnesium and aluminum and raises the pH of water. As the crystals form, they trap other waste substances including radium, rare earths, anions and transition metals. The resulting mixture can be removed via settling, centrifuge, or other mechanical means.

See also
 Barbertonite
 Brucite, 
 Fougerite
 Layered double hydroxide (LDH)
 Magnesium hydroxide
 Stichtite

References

 Douglas, G., Shackleton, M. and Woods, P. (2014). Hydrotalcite formation facilitates effective contaminant and radionuclide removal from acidic uranium mine barren lixiviant. Applied Geochemistry, 42, 27-37.
 Douglas, G.B. (2014). Contaminant removal from Baal Gammon acidic mine pit water via in situ hydrotalcite formation. Applied Geochemistry, 51, 15-22.

Further reading
 

 

 

 

 

 

 

 

 

 

Magnesium minerals
Aluminium minerals
Carbonate minerals
Trigonal minerals
Minerals in space group 166
Hydrates